Cheqa Gorg (also Romanized as Cheqā Gorg, Chagha Gorg, Cheghā Gorg, and Choqāgorg) is a village in Borborud-e Gharbi Rural District, in the Central District of Aligudarz County, Lorestan Province, Iran. At the 2006 census, its population was 173, in 33 families.

References 

Towns and villages in Aligudarz County